Michael or Mike Sinclair may refer to:

Michael Sinclair (British Army officer) (1918–1944), British World War II officer, notable for being held captive in Colditz Castle
Michael Sinclair (American football) (born 1968), retired American football player
Michael Sinclair, pseudonym of Scottish diplomat and thriller writer Michael Shea
Mike Sinclair (footballer) (1938–2017), English footballer (Grimsby Town)